is a private junior college in Hadano, Kanagawa, Japan. It was founded in 1973 and since then it has admitted only females.

Department and graduate courses

Departments 
 Department of English Language

See also 
 List of junior colleges in Japan
 Sophia University

External links
 

Private universities and colleges in Japan
Japanese junior colleges
Universities and colleges in Kanagawa Prefecture
Hadano, Kanagawa